The 1917 Campeonato Carioca, the twelfth edition of that championship, kicked off on May 20, 1917, and ended on February 24, 1918. It was organized by LMDT (Liga Metropolitana de Desportos Terrestres, or Metropolitan Land Sports League). Ten teams participated. Fluminense won the title for the 6th time. No teams were relegated.

Participating teams

System 
The tournament would be disputed in a double round-robin format, with the team with the most points winning the title. The team with the fewest points would dispute a playoff against the champions of the second level.

Championship

Relegation playoffs 
The last-placed team, Villa Isabel, would dispute a playoff against Cattete, champions of the Second Level. Villa Isabel won the playoff.

References 

Campeonato Carioca seasons
Carioca